Denys Molchanov and Igor Zelenay were the defending champions but lost in the semifinals to Jiří Lehečka and Jiří Veselý.

Philipp Oswald and Filip Polášek won the title after defeating Lehečka and Veselý 6–4, 7–6(7–4) in the final.

Seeds

Draw

References

External links
 Main draw

Moneta Czech Open - Doubles
2019 Doubles